Muhammad Sihran Amrullah (born 8 March 1999), is an Indonesian professional footballer who plays as a winger for Liga 1 club Borneo.

Club career

Borneo
He was signed for Borneo to play in Liga 1 in the 2017 season. Sihran made his first-team debut on 4 November 2017 in a match against Perseru Serui. He contributed with only one league appearances and without scoring goals during with Borneo in 2017 season. In the 2018 Liga 1, he also only appeared once.

On 22 July 2019, he started his match in the new Liga 1 season for Borneo in a 1–1 draw over Badak Lampung. On 1 September 2019, Sihran scored his first goal for Borneo against TIRA-Persikabo in the 14th minute at the Pakansari Stadium, Bogor. He added his second goals of the season on 13 September with one goal against Arema, opening the scoring in a 2–2 draw at Kanjuruhan Stadium. Five days later, Sihran scored equalizer in a 2–1 home win over Madura United. During the 2019 season, he started to get a lot of playing minutes in the Borneo's squad. he contributed with 25 appearances and scored three goals.

In the 2020 season, he only made 2 league appearances for the club against Persipura Jayapura and Persija Jakarta. League officially suspended due to COVID-19 pandemic.

Sihran scored his first goal of the 2021–22 season on 4 September 2021, opening the scoring in an 3–1 home win game against Persebaya Surabaya. On 10 December, he give assists a goals Francisco Torres in Borneo's 1–2 lose over Arema.

Sihran scored his first goal of the 2023–23 season on 24 July 2022, in an home game against Arema. The game ended in a 3–0 victory for Borneo. 

He added his second goals of the season on 2 February 2023 with one goal against Arema, scored equalizer in a 1–1 draw at Maguwoharjo Stadium. On 8 March, he scored the opening goal in a 3–0 home win over Persija Jakarta. And this goal was special for him, as it coincided with his birthday. He added his fourth goals of the season four days later with one goal against PSIS Semarang in a 6–1 home win.

Career statistics

Club

References

External links
 Sihran Amrullah at Soccerway
 Sihran Amrullah at Liga Indonesia

1999 births
Living people
Indonesian footballers
Association football forwards
Liga 1 (Indonesia) players
Borneo F.C. players
People from Ternate
Sportspeople from North Maluku